Pseudoceroprepes nosivolella is a species of snout moth.

Distribution
It is known from eastern Madagascar, Kenya and Nigeria.

References

Viette, 1964. Descriptions de nouvelles espèces malgaches de Lépidoptères Phycitidae. - Bulletin mensuel de la Société linnéenne de Lyon 33(4):131–134.

Phycitinae
Moths described in 1964